The Pittsburgh Steam Engine Company, originally known as the Pittsburgh Engine Company, was a company founded in 1811 by Oliver Evans to manufacture high-pressure steam engines.

History 
This company opened for business shortly after Fulton's low-pressure New Orleans left Pittsburgh on her maiden voyage as the first steamboat west of the Appalachian Mountains. It was located at the corner of Front Street and Redoubt Alley in Downtown Pittsburgh, just blocks from the Monongahela wharf.

In addition to engines, the company made other heavy equipment and iron castings, including anchors on ships used by Commodore Perry in the War of 1812 on Lake Erie. 

The company also manufactured rolling mills for the iron industry.

References

History of Allegheny County, Pennsylvania
History of Pittsburgh
Ironworks and steel mills in Pennsylvania
Steam engine manufacturers
Manufacturing companies based in Pittsburgh
Industrial buildings and structures in Pennsylvania
Defunct manufacturing companies based in Pennsylvania